The unemployment rate in Spain increased to a high of 27% in 2013 after the Great Recession of 2008. By 2016 the unemployment rate was 21%. The largest community, Andalusia, has the highest unemployment rate of any community at 31%.

List of autonomous communities by unemployment rate

References 
EPA - Encuesta de Población Activa de las Comunidades Autónomas 2020

Autonomous communities by unemployment rate
Unemployment rate
Autonomous communities by unemployment rate
Gross state product
Unemployment
Spain, unemployment rate